United Nations Security Council resolution 2497 was adopted in 2019.

See also
 List of United Nations Security Council Resolutions 2401 to 2500 (2018–2019)

References

External links
Text of the Resolution at undocs.org

 2497
November 2019 events